Desmia quadrinotalis is a moth in the family Crambidae. It is found in Cuba.

References

Moths described in 1871
Desmia
Moths of the Caribbean
Endemic fauna of Cuba